The Russell Trust Association is the business name for the New Haven, Connecticut-based Skull and Bones society, incorporated in 1856.

The Russell Trust was incorporated by William Huntington Russell as its president, and Daniel Coit Gilman as its first treasurer. Gilman later went  on to become president of the University of California, Berkeley and Johns Hopkins University before leaving to become the first president of the Carnegie Foundation. Gilman also served as one of the first board members of the Russell Sage Foundation.

In 1943, by special act of the Connecticut state legislature, its trustees were granted an exemption from filing corporate reports with the Secretary of State, which is normally a requirement.

From 1978 until his death in 1988, business of the Russell Trust Association was handled by its single trustee, Brown Brothers Harriman & Co. partner John B. Madden. Madden started with Brown Brothers Harriman in 1946, under senior partner Prescott Bush. According to a 2016 filing with the IRS, the Russell Trust Association (filing as RTA Incorporated) has assets of $3,906,458, including  the structure at 64 High St. in New Haven, Connecticut. 

According to the IRS filing, the Association engages in "educational programs — structured programs of intellectual inquiry, sensitivity training and personal development  for students of Yale University focusing on topics of intellectual, political or cultural importance.  Recent topics have included homeland security, corporate governance and US international relations."

The business and political network of the Skull and Bones was detailed by Hoover Institution scholar Antony C. Sutton in the exposé, America's Secret Establishment. Social organizations connected to the Russell Trust network include Deer Island Club, which also operates as a corporation.

References

External links 
Brown Brothers Harriman & Co. Website

Companies based in New Haven County, Connecticut
1856 establishments in Connecticut
Skull and Bones Society